The ITT Industries & Goulds Pumps Salute to the Troops 250 was a NASCAR Busch Series stock car race held at Pikes Peak International Raceway, in Fountain, Colorado. It was added to the Busch Series schedule in 1998 and last run in 2005, after the owners of PPIR, International Speedway Corporation, closed the facility. The race was replaced the following season with the Goody's 250 at Martinsville Speedway, another ISC-owned track.

Past winners

References

External links
 

Former NASCAR races
NASCAR Xfinity Series races